Shree Cement is an Indian cement manufacturer, founded in Beawar, Rajasthan, in 1979. Now headquartered in Kolkata, it is one of the biggest cement makers in Northern India. Shree Cement has moved in the last two decades from having 2 million tonne (mt) production capacity to becoming the country’s third largest cement player, with an installed capacity of 43.3 mt in India and 50.4 mt overseas. It also produces and sells power under the name Shree Power (Captive Power Plant) and Shree Mega Power (Independent Power Plant).

Since 2006, it has more than quadrupled its production capacity both by expanding into new areas and increasing the capacities of the existing plants. Shree Cement has been ranked 4th in 2017 Responsible Business Rankings developed by IIM Udaipur.

History 
In 1979, BG Bangur incorporated Shree Cement. In 1983 they commissioned its first plant in Rajasthan and in 1985 it began production. Until then a family business, in 1995 BG Bangur’s family gained full control of the business. The current head of the company is 70-year-old Hari Mohan Bangur, who had joined his father, BG Bangur since he graduated from IIT Bombay in 1975. Nineteen years ago, in 2003, HM Bangur’s son Prashant Bangur too joined the business.

In November 2019, the company had raised Rs 2,399.99 crore through a qualified institutional programme at a share price of Rs 19806.46. Nearly two years later, post fund-raising in September 2021, the company announced to the bourses that it is pumping capital as part of its capex expansion plan. The company has announced it will invest Rs 4,750 crore until FY 2024. It has commissioned an integrated cement plant at Nawalgarh, Rajasthan, which will be operational by December 2023. The Rajasthan plant consists of 3.5 MTPA cement and 3.8 MTPA clinker facility. The capex also includes a 3 MTPA clinker plant near Purulia, WB.

Projects 
According to Mr. H.M. Bangur (MD, Shree Cement Ltd.), Shree Cement is very 'bullish' and are putting up new factories. The new projects include Puralia in West Bengal (to be completed by March 2023), Rajasthan, which is much bigger considering the cost of Rs 3,500 crore (expected to complete between December 2023 and March 2024) and Andhra Pradesh which is just started which is expected to be done by March 2024. The total investment is around Rs 6,500 crore and the plants when completed will add up to 10 mt to the total cement production (current total production is 57 mt). The current target of Shree Cement is to increase their production to 80 mt by 2030.

The interesting thing to be noted is that except Panipat and an acquisation in UAE (UCC), all the other projects are greenfield.

Cement Plants 
Plants are located in Beawar, Ras, Khushkhera, Jobner (Jaipur) and Suratgarh in Rajasthan, Laksar (Roorkee) in Uttarakhand, Panipat in Haryana, Bulandshahar in UP, Raipur in Chhattisgarh and Aurangabad in Bihar.

Power Plants
The company produces and sells power under the brand name Shree Power and Shree Mega Power (SMP).

Shree Power 
The company has installed 120 MW captive power plants split into two locations (Beawar & Ras) to meet the complete power needs of a 15 million tonne Integrated Cement Plant. Commissioned 2x18 MW Greenfield Power Plant at Beawar in 2002 which is running successfully. One 6 MW TG is also operating successfully with excess steam available from this 2x18 MW Power Plant. 4x18 unit is operational in RAS plant (40 km from Beawar). At same location 2x50 MW unit also exists and being fully operational. Company also believes in producing power from waste heat recovery methods (from Cement Kiln and preheat).  Making a total of 265MW captive power along with 300MW independent.

Financials

References

External links 

Cement companies of India
Manufacturing companies based in Kolkata
NIFTY 50
Indian companies established in 1979
1979 establishments in Rajasthan
Manufacturing companies established in 1979
Companies listed on the National Stock Exchange of India
Companies listed on the Bombay Stock Exchange